The Women's 200m T37 had its First Round held on September 13, at 11:11 and the Final held on September 14 at 11:08.

Medalists

Results

References
Round 1 - Heat 1
Round 1 - Heat 2
Final

Athletics at the 2008 Summer Paralympics
2008 in women's athletics